Khumoetsile Kufigwa (born 31 December 1990) is a Botswana football midfielder who currently plays for Morupule Wanderers.

References

1990 births
Living people
Botswana footballers
Nico United players
Orapa United F.C. players
Mochudi Centre Chiefs SC players
Sharps Shooting Stars FC players
Association football midfielders
Botswana international footballers